The 6th Lo Nuestro Awards ceremony, presented by the Univision, honored the best Latin music of 1993 and 1994 and took place on May 19, 1994, at a live presentation held at the James L. Knight Center in Miami, Florida. The ceremony was broadcast in the United States and Latin America by Univision.

During the ceremony, twenty categories were presented. Winners were announced at the live event and included Cuban-American singer Gloria Estefan and Tejano band La Mafia, each receiving three awards, and Luis Miguel and Wilfrido Vargas, each receiving two awards. Among its honors, Miguel won the award for "Pop Album of the Year," La Mafia for "Regional Mexican Album of the Year," and Estefan won the award for "Tropical/Salsa Album of the Year." Cuban-American record producer Emilio Estefan received the Excellence Award.

Background 
In 1989, the Lo Nuestro Awards were established by Univision, to recognize the most talented performers of Latin music. The nominees were selected by Univision and the winners chosen by the public. The categories included are for the Pop, Tropical/Salsa, Regional Mexican and Rap genres, and Music Video. The trophy awarded is shaped like a treble clef. The 6th Lo Nuestro Award ceremony was held on May 19, 1994, in a live presentation held at the James L. Knight Center in Miami, Florida. The ceremony was broadcast in United States and Latin America by Univision.

Winners and nominees 

Winners were announced before the live audience during the ceremony. Mexican singer Luis Miguel was the most nominated performer, with five nominations, including Pop Album (Aries), Male Artist, Pop Song ("Ayer" and "Hasta Que Me Olvides"), and Video of the Year ("Ayer"). Miguel was awarded in the first two categories, with fellow Mexican singer Cristian Castro winning for Pop Song for the single "Nunca Voy a Olvidarte", and Spanish singer Rosario Flores receiving the accolade for Video of the Year for "Sabor, Sabor". All the songs nominated for Pop Song of the Year, Miguel's "Ayer" and "Hasta Que Me Olvides", "Con Los Años Que Me Quedan" by Gloria Estefan, "Muchacha Triste" by Los Fantasmas del Caribe, and Castro's "Nunca Voy a Olvidarte", reached number-one at the Billboard Top Latin Songs chart. Tejano band La Mafia dominated the Regional Mexican field winning all their nominations, including Album of the Year (Ahora y Siempre), Regional Mexican Song ("Me Estoy Enamorando") and Group of the Year. Mi Tierra by Cuban-American singer Gloria Estefan was named Tropical/Salsa Album of the Year, and Estefan received the Female Artist Pop and Tropical/Salsa Artist awards. Estefan's husband, record producer Emilio Estefan earned the Excellence Award.

See also
1993 in Latin music

References

1994 music awards
Lo Nuestro Awards by year
1994 in Florida
1994 in Latin music
1990s in Miami